David Hammond (born 1995) is an Irish radio presenter. He is known for presenting the lunchtime show Beat's Big Lunch on Beat 102 103. He previously presented Top 7@7 and the Takeover on Beat.

Career
Hammond began his radio career in 2015 presenting for LMFM, an independent radio station based in Drogheda. After completing college, he joined Beat 102 103, an independent radio station based in South East Ireland, presenting the evening shows Top 7@7 and the Takeover from 2017 to 2019. In January 2019, Hammond began to present the lunchtime show Beat's Big Lunch on Beat 102 103.

Personal life
Hammond was born in Bettystown, County Meath. He attended Dundalk Institute of Technology in 2014 and completed his Bachelor of Arts degree in Media, Arts and Technology in 2017.

Since 2018, Hammond has been dating qualified make-up artist Alisha O'Rourke.

Awards
On 5 October 2018, Hammond won the Gold Award for Radio DJ of the Year at the IMRO Radio Awards. On 4 October 2019, Hammond won the Silver Award for Radio DJ of the Year at the IMRO Radio Awards. On 2 October 2020, Hammond won the Gold Award for Radio DJ of the Year at the IMRO Radio Awards.

References

Living people
Irish radio presenters
People from County Meath
Alumni of Dundalk Institute of Technology
1995 births